See also Jörgen Andersson (politician).
Jörgen Ingemar Andersson (born 14 September 1951 in Önnestad, Sweden) is a Swedish actor, dramaturge and pedagog. He studied at Malmö Theatre Academy.

Selected filmography
1997 - Beck – Mannen med ikonerna
1987 - Lackalänga (TV)
1985 - Åshöjdens BK (TV)
1978 - Grabbarna i 57:an (TV)

References and sources

External links
Jörgen Andersson on Swedish Film Database

Swedish male actors
Living people
1951 births
People from Kristianstad Municipality
Dramaturges